A database engineer, Muhammad Shareef Abdelhaleem is one of 17 people initially arrested in the 2006 Toronto terrorism arrests. He is alleged to have plotted coordinated bombing attacks against targets in southern Ontario.

Life
Born in Egypt as the oldest of four siblings, Abdelhaleem lived in Egypt, Jordan and England as a child, and moved to Canada with his parents in 1989 at the age of 10.

His father, Tariq Abdelhaleem, is an engineer on contract with Atomic Energy of Canada, and is well known for his own writings as an Imam, including a fatwa against watering down the message of Islam. He was interviewed prior to his son's arrests, denouncing the wars in Iraq and Afghanistan. Tariq was among those who posted bail for security certificate detainee Mohammad Mahjoub earlier in the year. At Abdelhaleem's trial it was revealed that his father had issued a fatwa for the group declaring the attacks “acceptable”.

Abdelhaleem was a 30-year-old computer programmer at the time of his arrest, and drove a metallic blue BMW convertible. He underwent open-heart surgery just two months before the arrest. He was by far the wealthiest of the group and had sought information on offshore bank accounts.

His father has visited Abdelhaleem every Saturday morning for three years, but lied to his youngest daughter and explains her older brother is in a "hospital" and behind plexiglass for all visits because he's contagious.

Actions leading to arrest
He is alleged to have been brought into the fertilizer purchasing by Zakaria Amara.

Amara gave him money and Abdelhaleem then gave C$2,000 to Shaher Elsohemy who was a former friend now police mole, which the Elsohemy claimed was a "downpayment" on ammonium nitrate. When police stormed his house, he reported that he was mostly concerned with making sure the seven stray cats who lived in his home were alright.

Trial
Throughout the trial Abdelhaleem maintained that he was merely a middle-man keeping contact between ringleader Zakaria Amara and mole Shaher Elsohemy.  His lawyer has stated that the accusations against his client were due to an old friend seeking revenge through his connections to the police. In his testimony Elsohemy stated that Abdelhaleem was initially opposed to the plan but changed his mind when he realized he could benefit financially from the attack.  He had also contributed various suggestions about the plan such as spreading out the timing of the attack to increase the terror factor.  This was opposed by Amara who wanted to inflict “maximum casualties”.
On January 21, 2010, Abdelhaleem was found guilty of plotting to bomb financial, intelligence and military targets. He was not convicted however as the defense was awarded a stay of proceedings in order to look into whether or not the case could be considered as entrapment. The argument of entrapment was dismissed by the courts, citing "virtually no evidence" to support the claims as well as Abdelhaleem's erratic and bizarre behavior in the while on the stand. On March 4, 2011, Ontario Superior Court Justice Fletcher Dawson sentenced Abdelhaleem to life in prison.

Abdelhaleem is currently located in the Special Handling Unit (SHU) of the Cowansville Institution in Cowansville, Quebec.

Homegrown

In 2009 and 2010 playwright Catherine Frid wrote a play, Homegrown, about a friendship that developed between herself and Shareef.
The play premiered at Theatre Passe Muraille on August 5, 2010.  The play stirred controversy because it portrayed Shareef sympathetically.

Theatre critic Richard Ouzounian did not recommend the play to the general public. He commented that it was "definitely not a play that supports or romanticizes terrorism, but one that raises some interesting questions about the government's purchase of undercover “moles” to entrap and deliver so-called terrorists, often at prices well into the millions."

References

External links
Cageprisoners: Shareef Abdelhaleem
CaptiveInCanada.com, site run by Abdelhaleem's father

2006 Ontario terrorism plot
Egyptian emigrants to Canada
Living people
People from Toronto
1976 births
People imprisoned on charges of terrorism
People convicted on terrorism charges
Canadian prisoners and detainees
Prisoners and detainees of Canada